Shankarrao Genuji Kolhe (24 March 1929 – 16 March 2022) was an Indian politician and the Member of the Legislative Assembly (MLA) and a minister in Government of Maharashtra.

Early life and education
Kolhe was born Yesgaon village, now in Kopargaon taluka, Ahmednagar district, Maharashtra. He attended Pune University to earn a B.Sc in Agriculture. He received a Ford Foundation scholarship to receive additional training in the United States and Europe. In 1953, he travelled to Salt Lake City, Utah as an agricultural education program trainee.

Career

Political career
Kolhe began his political career as a sarpanch in 1950 and moved up to the state minister post. He was elected as an independent to the Maharashtra Legislative Assembly in 1972. As a state minister he handled revenue (1991), transport (1992) portfolios. He was a perennial political opponent of the Vikhe-Patil family. 

In 1970s, he led farmers March to Reserve Bank of India, Mumbai to demand a reduction in interest rates on loan to farmers.

He served as the vice-chairman of the Shri Saibaba Sansthan Trust, Shirdi from 2004 to 2012. He was on the executive committee of Rayat Shikshan Sanstha.

Cooperative sector work
Kolhe was known for his work in the cooperative sector. His work started in 1953 when he formed a taluka-level cooperative (Kopargaon Taluka Vikas Mandal) in Kopargaon to aid farmers.

In 1963, he founded the cooperative sugar factory Sahakar Maharshi Shankarrao Kolhe Sahakari Sakhar Karkhana Ltd. (previously The Sanjivani (Takli) Sahakari Sakhar Karkhana Ltd.) near Sahajanand Nagar, Shingnapur in Kopargaon. He also started the National Heavy Engineering Co-operative Ltd. in Pune, Godavari (Khore) Co-operative Milk Society (1976),

Death
Kolhe died  in Nashik on 16 March 2022 at the age of 92.

References

External links
Timeline in Marathi

1929 births
2022 deaths
Indian social workers
Indian National Congress politicians from Maharashtra
Nationalist Congress Party politicians from Maharashtra
People from Ahmednagar district
Maharashtra MLAs 1972–1978
Maharashtra MLAs 1978–1980
Maharashtra MLAs 1980–1985
Maharashtra MLAs 1990–1995
Maharashtra MLAs 1995–1999
Maharashtra MLAs 1999–2004